Jim Lightfoot (born 11 November 1933) is a former international speedway rider from England.

Speedway career 
Lightfoot reached the final of the Speedway World Championship in the 1963 Individual Speedway World Championship.

He rode in the top tier of British Speedway from 1953 to 1966, riding for Coventry Bees. Jim was born within 4 miles of Coventry’s Brandon stadium and captained his team for a number of years, Jim was capped by England once and Great Britain three times.

World final appearances

Individual World Championship
 1963 –  London, Wembley Stadium – 14th – 4pts
 1964 -  Gothenburg, Ullevi - Reserve - Did not ride

References 

1933 births
British speedway riders
Coventry Bees riders
Long Eaton Archers riders
Living people